"Small Talk" is a song by American singer Katy Perry. It was released as a standalone single by Capitol Records on August 9, 2019. It was announced in a social media post on August 6, 2019. Perry co-wrote the song with Jacob Kasher and its producers Charlie Puth and Johan Carlsson of Carolina Liar. "Small Talk" was included as a bonus track on the Japanese and deluxe edition of Perry's sixth studio album, Smile.

Background
Charlie Puth talked about the song in an Instagram post in July 2019. On August 6, Perry posted several pictures to her social media accounts of lines from the song, with the first reading "Isn't it weird / That you've seen me naked / We had conversations about forever / Now it's about the weather okay". The song's music video was released on August 30, 2019.

On November 29, 2019, a Black Friday Record Store Day limited edition 12" orange vinyl was released, pairing the song with Perry's previous single "Never Really Over".

Music video
Perry and her pet dog Nugget attend a dog show where they win the top prize. She sees another competitor (played by model Charley Santos) and immediately falls for him. Perry's attention is shifted to the man and she ignores her dog. Eventually he moves in with Perry and brings his dog. Perry, the man and their two dogs are seen all together at the end.

Chart performance
"Small Talk" debuted and peaked at number 81 on the US Billboard Hot 100. In Canada, the song peaked at number 56, while reaching number 33 in Australia. On the UK Singles Chart, it peaked at number 43, while being more commercially successful in Scotland where it entered the top 20 and peaked at number 18.

Track listing
Digital download and streaming
"Small Talk" — 2:42

Digital download and streaming (Lost Kings Remix)
"Small Talk" (Lost Kings Remix) — 2:52

Digital download and streaming (Sofi Tukker Remix)
"Small Talk" (Sofi Tukker Remix) — 3:12

Digital download and streaming (White Panda Remix)
"Small Talk" (White Panda Remix) — 3:12

12-inch vinyl
"Never Really Over" – 3:44
"Small Talk" – 2:41

Credits and personnel
Credits adapted from Tidal.

 Katy Perry – vocals, songwriter
 Charlie Puth – producer, songwriter, programmer
 Johan Carlsson – producer, songwriter, programmer
 Jacob Kasher – songwriter
 Peter Karlsson – vocal editor, vocal producer
 Bill Zimmerman – engineer
 Rachael Findlen – engineer
 Sam Holland – engineer
 Dave Kutch – mastering engineer
 Phil Tan – mixer
 Jeremy Lertola – assistant recording engineer

Charts

Certifications

Release history

References

2019 singles
2019 songs
American synth-pop songs
Capitol Records singles
Katy Perry songs
Songs written by Charlie Puth
Songs written by Jacob Kasher
Songs written by Johan Carlsson (musician)
Songs written by Katy Perry
Music videos directed by Tanu Muino